Tyree Lamar Pittman (born November 14, 1993), better known by his stage name Young Chop, is an American record producer, rapper, and songwriter. In 2012, he gained widespread recognition within the American hip hop community for producing Chief Keef's hits "I Don't Like", "Love Sosa", and "3Hunna". He released his first studio album Precious in 2013, established his own label, Chop Squad Records, and released the album Still the following year. Young Chop, with Chief Keef, the late Fredo Santana, and others, belong to the Chicago collective called 3hunna, making drill music in which they generally rap about drug dealing, weapons, and their lifestyles.

Life and career
Pittman grew up in the South Side of Chicago, Illinois. Pittman started making beats when he was 11 years old with the help of his cousin. He met Chief Keef on Facebook and went on to produce many of his songs. Pittman is part of a production team collective called BandKamp which also includes producer and CEO BandKamp, Paris Beuller and intern WaldooBeatz, Chief Keef's Back From The Dead was officially the first mixtape he produced. Pittman recently started his own independent label called Chop Squad. He has also started a website called SoundKitWiz.com, an online retail music production website where producers and engineers can purchase audio engineering and music production related products. His producer tag is "Young Chop On the Beat", spoken by his 4 year old nephew.

Controversy
In April 2020, Pittman uploaded a video on Instagram of him firing shots outside his house after people outside were calling his name. On April 5, 2020, Pittman was streaming on Instagram Live whilst looking for Atlanta-based rapper 21 Savage. Pittman had already called out 21 Savage publicly a few days before the incident. After returning to the Uber car transporting him, Pittman claimed that the vehicle was shot at, showing footage of shattered glass as proof.

On April 16, 2020, Pittman was arrested in Gwinnett County, Georgia for violating his probation. He was also charged with aggravated cruelty to animals-death after allegedly starving his dog to death in February 2020.

Discography

Studio albums
Precious (2013)
Still (2014)
Fat Gang or No Gang (2015)
Finally Rich Too (2015)
King Chop (2016)
Coppotelli (2016)
King Chop 2 (2018)
Don't Sleep (2019)
Comfortable (2019)
Young Godfather (2020)
Intro x Young Godfather (2020)
Under Surveillance (2021)

References

1993 births
African-American record producers
American hip hop record producers
American music industry executives
American retail chief executives
Businesspeople from Chicago
Drill musicians
Living people
Midwest hip hop musicians
Trap musicians
Musicians from Chicago
Warner Records artists
Record producers from Illinois
21st-century African-American people
FL Studio users